Jesse Davis may refer to:

Jesse Davis (American football) (born 1991), American football player
Jesse Davis (saxophonist) (born 1965), American saxophonist
Jesse Ed Davis (1944–1988), American guitarist

See Also
Jess H. Davis (1906–1971), American academic administrator
Jessie Bartlett Davis (1860–1905), American singer